Jhonny Senen Bilbao Bande (born 9 October 1974) is a Venezuelan former sailor, who specialized in the Finn class. He represented his nation Venezuela at the 2008 Summer Olympics, finishing last out of 26 registered sailors. A member of Centro de Vela Ligera in his native Anzoategui province, Bilbao trained for the country's sailing federation under the tutelage of his personal coach and father José.

Bilbao competed for the Venezuelan sailing squad, as a 33-year-old, in the Finn class at the 2008 Summer Olympics in Beijing. Building up to his Olympic selection, he formally accepted a berth forfeited by Germany, as the next highest-ranked sailor vying for qualification, at the Finn Gold Cup in Melbourne, Australia. Bilbao accumulated a net grade of 149 to round out the 26-man fleet in the last spot at the end of eight races.

References

External links
 
 
 
 

1974 births
Living people
Venezuelan male sailors (sport)
Olympic sailors of Venezuela
Sailors at the 2008 Summer Olympics – Finn
People from Barcelona, Venezuela
20th-century Venezuelan people
21st-century Venezuelan people